Stick It to Ya is the debut studio album by American glam metal band Slaughter. It was released in 1990 by Chrysalis Records. It sold over 2 million copies and became one of the biggest albums of 1990. "Up All Night"(#27), "Fly to the Angels"(#19) & "Spend My Life"(#39) all charted in the Top 40 on Billboard Magazine's Hot 100 and their videos were in solid rotations on the various music television outlets. "Mad About You" also received considerable airplay on Album Rock stations as the band toured to support the release. The LP was also nominated for a best metal album of the year at the 1991 American Music Awards show. Music videos were made for the singles "Up All Night", "Fly to the Angels", "Spend My Life", and "Mad About You".

Track listing

All songs written, arranged and produced by Mark Slaughter & Dana Strum.

Personnel

Band members
 Mark Slaughter - Lead Vocals, Guitar, and Keyboards
 Tim Kelly - Guitar, background vocals
 Dana Strum - Bass, background vocals
 Blas Elias - Drums, percussion, background vocals

Additional musicians
 Todd Cooper - Horns
 Gerri Miller - Camera noises

Production
Produced By Mark Slaughter & Dana Strum
Production Co-Ordination by Scott Cadwallader
Engineer: Andy Chappel
Mixing: Brian Malouf
Mastering: Bob Ludwig

Charts

Weekly charts

Year-end charts

Singles
Up All Night / Eye to Eye - April 17, 1990 - Chrysalis 23486 #27 US Hot 100
Fly to the Angels / Desperately - July 23, 1990 - Chrysalis 23527 #19 US Hot 100
Spend My Life / She Wants More - December 4, 1990 - Chrysalis 23605 #39 US Hot 100
Mad About You / Up All Night (Live) - April 2, 1991 - Chrysalis 23699

Certifications

Cover art

 Art direction: Glen Wexler and Hugh Syme
 Photography: Glen Wexler
 Model: Laurie Carr

This image used on the cover of the album was the last project Wexler created using traditional darkroom methods. The Target girl posed in his studio, and a miniature set of the carnival was placed in perspective for the background.

References

Slaughter (band) albums
1990 debut albums
Chrysalis Records albums